Raya and the Last Dragon is a 2021 American computer-animated fantasy action-adventure film produced by Walt Disney Animation Studios and distributed by Walt Disney Studios Motion Pictures. The 59th film produced by the studio, it was directed by Don Hall and Carlos López Estrada, and produced by Osnat Shurer and Peter Del Vecho. The screenplay was written by Qui Nguyen and Adele Lim, both of whom also wrote the story with Hall, Estrada, Paul Briggs, John Ripa, Kiel Murray, and Dean Wellins, based on story ideas by Bradley Raymond and additional story contributions by Helen Kalafatic. Featuring the voices of Kelly Marie Tran, Awkwafina, Izaac Wang, Gemma Chan, Daniel Dae Kim, Benedict Wong, Sandra Oh, Thalia Tran, Lucille Soong, and Alan Tudyk, Raya and the Last Dragon is about the titular warrior princess, Raya (Tran). She seeks out the fabled last dragon (Awkwafina), hoping to restore the dragon gem that would bring back her father (Dae Kim) and banish the evil spirits known as the Druun from the land of Kumandra.

The film is inspired by traditional Southeast Asian cultures. Development began in October 2018, and in August 2019 the project was officially announced, with the title being revealed alongside the voice cast. During its production, Disney officially announced the replacement of several cast and crew members in August 2020 which includes the initially announced lead Cassie Steele being replaced by Kelly Marie Tran due to changes in character and plot. To prevent further spread of the SARS CoV-2 virus during the COVID-19 pandemic, the filmmakers practiced social distancing, working from home using digital communication software like Zoom. 

Walt Disney Studios Motion Pictures had planned to release Raya and the Last Dragon in theaters in the United States on November 25, 2020, but the movie was delayed to March 5, 2021 due to the COVID-19 pandemic. The film was simultaneously available on Disney+ Premier Access as a result of the pandemic's effects on movie theaters. The film became the third most streamed movie title of 2021, and has grossed over $130 million worldwide (not including its Disney+ Premier Access revenue). It received positive reviews from critics, who praised the animation, the female empowerment, craftsmanship, visuals, action sequences, characters and voice acting, but criticized its lack of Southeast Asian representation in the cast, over-engineered narrative and anachronistic humor. The film received various accolades, including a nomination for Best Animated Feature Film at the 94th Academy Awards, and was nominated in the same category at the 79th Golden Globe Awards. However, it lost both awards to Encanto, another Walt Disney Animation Studios film. Raya and the Last Dragon also led the 49th Annie Awards with ten nominations, but did not win in any of the categories nominated.

Plot
Five hundred years ago, the peaceful and prosperous sub-continent of Kumandra is ravaged by the Druun, mindless purple-and-black-colored spirits that turn every living thing in their path to stone. Sisu, the last surviving dragon, is given her siblings' magic which was placed in a gem. She concentrates her magic into the gem and blasts the Druun away, reviving Kumandra's people but not its dragons. A power struggle for the gem divides Kumandra's people into five separate chiefdoms called Fang, Heart, Spine, Talon, and Tail, corresponding to their placement along a gigantic dragon-shaped river.

In the present, Chief Benja of the Heart tribe, which ends up retaining possession of the dragon gem, trains his daughter, young warrior princess Raya to protect the gem. Firmly believing Kumandra can be reunited, Benja holds a feast for the leadership of all five tribes. During the feast, Raya befriends Namaari, daughter of Chief Virana of the Fang tribe and Fang's princess, who gives Raya a dragon pendant and tells her of a legend that says the dragon Sisu still exists and can be summoned through the power of the gem. Trusting Namaari, Raya shows her the gem's chamber. Namaari betrays Raya as part of a plot to help Fang steal the gem. Alerted to the attack, Benja and the other tribes arrive and start fighting over the gem, breaking it into five pieces in the scuffle. The gem's destruction creates a fissure which releases the Druun once more, quickly overtaking the Land of Heart. As every tribe leader steals a piece of the gem and flees, Benja notices that the Druun are repelled by water and sacrifices himself to save Raya's life by throwing her in the river before getting turned to stone by the Druun.

Six years later, Raya treks across Kumandra searching for Sisu to have her create another gem and banish the Druun once more. She manages to summon her at a shipwreck in Tail where Sisu admits that she did not create the gem, but wielded it on behalf of her four siblings, who each contributed their magic to the gem. Raya and Sisu resolve to take back the four stolen pieces of the gem, reassemble it and use it to banish the Druun and restore Raya's father and others who were turned to stone.

Raya and Sisu travel across the realm, reclaiming pieces of the gem and making new friends: the young restaurateur Boun from Tail, the baby con artist Little Noi and her three ongis from Talon, and the warrior Tong from Spine, all of whom have lost loved ones to the Druun. Namaari pursues Raya, hoping to gain the gem shards for the Fang tribe. Each gem shard they acquire blesses Sisu with one of her siblings' magical powers. Raya, not fully trusting their new companions, insists Sisu remain disguised as a human, but Sisu reveals herself to save Raya from Namaari at Spine.

At Fang, Sisu persuades Raya to propose an alliance to Namaari rather than steal the final piece of the gem. As a gesture of trust, Raya returns the pendant Namaari gave her years ago. Namaari, torn between her responsibility to Fang and her wish to help defeat the Druun, threatens them with a crossbow. Sisu tries to calm Namaari but Raya attacks with her whipsword when she sees Namaari's finger on the trigger, causing the crossbow to fire and kill Sisu.

Sisu's death drains away all the water of Kumandra, allowing the Druun to overrun the realm. Furious by Namaari's actions, Raya pursues Namaari, whom she finds grieving the petrification of her mother. They bitterly fight one another while Raya's companions use the gem pieces to evacuate the people of Fang. Raya defeats and prepares to kill Namaari, but stops when Namaari reminds Raya of her role in Sisu’s death due to her inability to trust others. Raya and Namaari go to aid the others. As the Druun gain on her group, Raya remembers how trust allowed Sisu to save the world. She urges the others to unite and reassemble the gem, showing her faith in Namaari by handing over her gem piece and allowing the Druun to turn her into stone. Boun, Tong, Noi, and the ongis follow suit, and Namaari reassembles the gem before the Druun petrify her as well. With the dragon gem reassembled, it unleashes a powerful shockwave that spreads throughout Kumandra, vanquishes all the Druun, and conjures up a magical rainstorm which revives everyone, alongside all the dragons who later revive Sisu. The group reunites with their lost loved ones, including Raya and her father; the tribes and dragons gather at Heart to unify as Kumandra once again.

Voice cast 

 Kelly Marie Tran as Raya, the fierce and virtuous warrior princess of Heart who has been training to become a Guardian of the Dragon Gem. To change her father from stone back into himself and restore peace to Kumandra, she embarks on a search for the last dragon.
 Awkwafina as Sisu, the last dragon in existence. She has a goofy and somewhat insecure personality, but she is also brave, kind, and wise.
 Izaac Wang as Boun, a charismatic 10-year-old entrepreneur who is originally from Tail and lost his family to the Druun.
 Gemma Chan as Namaari, the warrior princess of Fang and Raya's rival.
 Jona Xiao as young Namaari.
 Daniel Dae Kim as Chief Benja, Raya's father, the chief of Heart.
 Benedict Wong as Tong, a formidable, towering, kind-hearted warrior from Spine who lost his family and fellow villagers to the Druun.
 Sandra Oh as Virana, Namaari's mother and the chieftess of Fang.
 Thalia Tran as Little Noi, a toddler con artist from Talon who lost her mother to the Druun. She was raised by the ongis, creatures that resembles monkeys with catfish whiskers.
 Lucille Soong as Dang Hu, the chieftess of Talon.
 Alan Tudyk as Tuk Tuk, Raya's best friend and trusty steed who is a mix of armadillo and pill bug. His name is a reference to the nickname of auto rickshaws in Thailand.

The film featured the voice of  Dichen Lachman as both General Atitaya of Fang and a Spine warrior; Patti Harrison was cast as the chief of Tail; Dumbfoundead portrayed Chai, a flower guy; Sung Kang voices Dang Hai, the former chief of Talon; Sierra Katow voices both a Talon merchant and a Fang officer; Ross Butler voices the chief of Spine; François Chau voices Wahn; and Gordon Ip and Paul Yen voice Talon merchants.

Production

Development
In October 2018, Deadline Hollywood reported Disney was developing a fantasy animated film produced by Osnat Shurer from a screenplay by Adele Lim, with additional directorial debuts by Paul Briggs and Dean Wellins. Most of them have been involved in other Disney films including Frozen (2013), Zootopia (2016) and Moana (2016). The film was untitled at the time and its characters remained unclear because of Disney's general policy of secrecy about its development timeline, but casting details hinted that it would involve a female protagonist with Asian characteristics. In August 2019, Disney officially announced the film during its D23 Expo Walt Disney Animation Studios' presentation panel. They announced the casting of Cassie Steele as Raya and of Awkwafina as Sisu.

In August 2020, Disney officially announced the replacement of several cast and crew members. Don Hall, director of Winnie the Pooh (2011) and Big Hero 6 (2014), and Carlos López Estrada, who had joined Disney Animation in 2019, took over as directors at an unexpected invitation upon being impressed by Estrada’s directorial work on the comedy-drama film Blindspotting (2018). Briggs joined John Ripa as one of the writers of the story having been demoted from his initial position as co-director, to which he was later rehired. Ripa also later became a co-director of the film, replacing Dean Wellins. The latter was credited in the final film as a writer of the story. In addition Qui Nguyen joined Lim as co-writer and Peter Del Vecho joined Shurer as producer. Steele was also replaced by Kelly Marie Tran due to changes in characters and plot. Shurer said the cast must embody the same spirits as the character and that Tran was better suited for the role.

According to Hall, Disney recast the role because Raya had been originally conceived of as a "stoic loner", but the team began to infuse her with elements of "levity" and "swagger" similar to the character of Star-Lord in Marvel's Guardians of the Galaxy (2014). The Hollywood Reporter said Tran was selected for her "lightness and buoyancy, but also badassery".  Tran had to learn to trust the production team because she had unsuccessfully auditioned for the role of Raya. By January 2020, when Tran replaced Steele as Raya, she was aware Disney Animation had already rejected her before and was now hiring her to replace another female actor. Disney's casting choices on Raya and the Last Dragon were kept secret from the cast members; Disney hired each of them separately and had them record their lines individually. The cast, however, accidentally discovered each other's involvement before Disney officially revealed the cast list.

The film is set in a fantasy land called Kumandra, inspired by the Southeast Asian cultures of Brunei, Singapore, Laos, Thailand, Timor-Leste, Cambodia, Vietnam, Myanmar, Malaysia, Indonesia, and the Philippines. For background research the filmmakers and production team traveled to Thailand, Vietnam, Cambodia, Indonesia, the Philippines, and Laos. The filmmakers formed the Southeast Asia Story Trust, a collective of cultural consultants for the film which included Dr. Steve Arounsack, an associate professor of Lao Anthropology at California State University, Stanislaus. Thai artist Fawn Veerasunthorn served as the head of story for the film.

To choose the protagonist's name the filmmakers reviewed dozens of suggestions which were recommended by experts from Disney's Southeast Asia Story Trust. Screenwriter Adele Lim had an emotional reaction when she first heard the name "Raya", which means "celebration" in Malay. To prevent further spread of the SARS CoV-2 virus during the COVID-19 pandemic, the filmmakers practiced social distancing, working from home using digital communication software like Zoom.

Animation
Raya and the Last Dragon portrays a combination of Southeast Asian cultures; Raya's hat is identical to the Philippines' traditional headgear.   Water is one of the plot's central elements; it is used to illustrate Raya's emotional growth. Smoothly colored bodies of water represent moments in which Raya feels close to those around her while distrust is represented by water bodies depicted with higher contrast that dramatizes shadows and silhouettes. Raya's costume design, hairstyle, and equipment are also based on her fighting ability and traditional Southeast Asian garments.

Production of the film was supervised by executive producer Jennifer Lee, chief creative officer of Disney Animation. Kelsey Hurley supervised an all-female leadership team with the help of associate technical supervisors Gabriela Hernandez and Shweta Viswanathan. This team oversaw the flow of technical resources; editing and rendering software programs such as Autodesk Maya, Houdini, and Nuke, and programming languages like Python and C++ were used on the production.

Music

James Newton Howard composed the score for Raya and the Last Dragon, making his fourth feature-length collaboration with the animation studio after Dinosaur, Atlantis: The Lost Empire, and Treasure Planet. The score was released on February 26, 2021. Jhené Aiko wrote and performed a song entitled "Lead the Way" for the end credits.

On March 2, 2021, Disney Studios Philippines announced Filipina singer KZ Tandingan would be singing "Gabay" (Guide), Disney's first-ever Filipino-language song. The track, the Filipino version of "Lead the Way", would be part of the film's soundtrack for the Filipino dub of the film. Allie Benedicto, studio marketing head of Disney Philippines, said the song "demonstrates our commitment to work with local creative talents to tell our stories in a locally relevant manner". In a press release, Tandingan said she was grateful and proud to be singing in her native language as well as singing in a Disney film. She liked its messages of trust as well as coming together and uniting to change the world when feeling weak and alone.

Marketing 
In the month of the release of the film, the world builder video game Disney Magic Kingdoms included a limited time "Raya and the Last Dragon Event" to promote it, with the characters involved in a new storyline unrelated to the events of the film, including Raya, Sisu, Tuk Tuk, Boun and Namaari as playable characters, in addition to Heart Palace, Fang Palace, and Boun's Shrimp Boat as attractions.

Release

Theatrical and streaming
Raya and the Last Dragon was originally scheduled to be released in the United States on November 25, 2020. Due to the COVID-19 pandemic, however,  the film's release was delayed to March 12, 2021. On December 10, 2020, as part of Disney's Investor Day presentation, it was announced the film's theatrical release date was preponed to March 5, 2021, and would be simultaneously released on Disney+ Premier Access. Raya and the Last Dragon was available for purchase through Premier Access until June 4, 2021; it was available free to all subscribers in Latin America from April 23, and from June 4 in other countries. In theaters, Raya and the Last Dragon was accompanied by the short film Us Again.

Home media
Walt Disney Studios Home Entertainment released Raya and the Last Dragon on Digital HD on April 2, 2021, with DVD, Blu-ray, and Ultra HD Blu-ray releases following a month later on May 18. The digital release also included Us Again. Bonus features bundled with its Blu-ray release include "An Introduction to Us Again", a behind-the-scenes look of the short Us Again; "Taste of Raya", a virtual Southeast Asian dining experience; "Raya: Bringing It Home", an inside look on how the animators worked at home; "Martial Artists", a lesson on the martial art forms and weapons used in the film; "We are Kumandra", the cultural influences of the film from the Southeast Asia Story Trust; outtakes from the film; facts and Easter eggs; Ripa's experience of working on the storyboard; and deleted scenes.

Reception

Box office 
Raya and the Last Dragon grossed $54.7 million in the United States and Canada, and $75.7 million in other territories for a worldwide total of $130.4 million.

In the US and Canada, the film was released alongside Chaos Walking and Boogie, and was initially projected to gross $6-$7 million in 2,045 theaters in its opening weekend. However, after making $2.5 million on its first day, due to the re-opening of New York City theaters, weekend estimates were raised to $8.3 million. On its debut weekend it took $8.5 million, topping the box office.

Theater chains  Cinemark and Harkins in the US, and Cineplex in Canada, did not initially run the film after declining Disney's rental terms, which led to Raya and the Last Dragon failing to match the opening-weekend grosses of The Croods: A New Age and Tom & Jerry, two family  films that were also released amid the pandemic. Raya and the Last Dragon performance, however, improved in the following weeks, matching and eventually surpassing Tom & Jerry's box office numbers. Raya and the Last Dragon made $5.5 million in its second weekend and $5.2 million in its third, remaining atop the box office.

Audience viewership
In its first three days in the week of March 1, Raya And The Last Dragon was watched for 355 million minutes and placed fourth for the week among movies. The film was made available on Disney+ without any additional cost on June 4, 2021, worldwide; it was the "second-most viewed streaming title" following after Netflix's Lucifer. Raya and the Last Dragon was viewed for approximately 1.1 billion minutes from May 31 to June 6, a significant increase for the film and any streaming title, which previously had 115 million viewing minutes a week when it was only available as a premium title for $30.

According to the official list of the most watched streaming titles of 2021 released on January 21, 2022, by Deadline and Nielsen, Raya and the Last Dragon ranked as the "third most streamed movie title of 2021" with 8.34 billion minutes watched, just behind Luca (2021) and Moana (2016) which had 10.5 billion and 8.9 billion minutes watched respectively. In January 2022, tech firm Akamai reported that the film was the ninth most pirated film of 2021.

Critical response
Raya and the Last Dragon received positive reviews from critics. Review aggregator Rotten Tomatoes reports 94% of 298 critics have given the film a positive review with an average rating of 7.7/10. The website's consensus reads: "Another gorgeously animated, skillfully voiced entry in the Disney canon, Raya and the Last Dragon continues the studio's increased representation while reaffirming that its classic formula is just as reliable as ever." On Metacritic, the film has a weighted average score of 74 out of 100 based on 48 critics, indicating "generally favorable reviews". Audiences polled by CinemaScore gave the film an average grade of "A" on an A+ to F scale while PostTrak reported 92% of audience members gave it a positive score and that 78% said they would definitely recommend it.

The female empowerment and the craftsmanship aspects were praised. IndieWire writer Kate Erbland assessed it with a "B+"; she found the film to be creative, favourably comparing it to Mulan (1998) and The Princess and the Frog (2009), and described its perspective as different. Shirley Li of The Atlantic strongly praised the world-building and detail, but thought: "subordinated the story to world building muddies the film's message". From the San Francisco Chronicle, Julie Tremaine complimented the depiction of females.

David Fear of Rolling Stone rated Raya and the Last Dragon three and a half stars out of five; in terms of praise, he attributed the action scenes and sequences and vocal performances to "actually mak[ing] the film come alive". In RogerEbert.com, the film was regarded as promoting female empowerment but not talking down to the audience in the process. Sandie Angulo Chen for Common Sense Media gave it a score of four out of five stars, particularly for its empowerment. At Forbes, the film's animation, humor, and emotional moments were praised.

Others were disappointed in the limited Southeast Asian representation in the cast, and found the narrative over-engineered. Keith Baldwin of PopDust.com criticized the trailer's cultural aesthetics and character motivations, while finding similarities to Avatar: the Last Airbender and The Legend of Korra. Most of the cast, with exceptions of Kelly Marie Tran, Butler, Thalia Tran, Wang, and Harrison, are of East Asian heritage. A. Felicia Wade of DiscussingFilm pointed this out in her review, commenting on the "disheartening" lack of accurate representation in the vocal cast, commenting it "misses the mark at its core". Justin Chang of NPR admired the animation and humor, but said the plot is over-detailed. The unavailability of Disney+ in the majority of Southeast Asia was also criticised.

Accolades

Notes

References

External links

 
 
 Official screenplay

2020s American animated films
2020s children's animated films
2020s English-language films
2020s fantasy adventure films
2021 action films
2021 computer-animated films
2021 fantasy films
2021 films
American animated adventure films
American animated fantasy films
American fantasy adventure films
American animated feature films
Animated buddy films
Animated films about dragons
Animated films about magic
Anime-influenced Western animation
Fictional duos
Films about shapeshifting
Films directed by Carlos López Estrada
Films directed by Don Hall
Films postponed due to the COVID-19 pandemic
Films produced by Peter Del Vecho
Films scored by James Newton Howard
Films set in a fictional country
Films with Disney+ Premier Access
IMAX films
Southeast Asia in fiction
Walt Disney Animation Studios films
Walt Disney Pictures animated films